The Talbot River is a river in the Great Lakes Basin in Central Ontario, Canada which flows from Talbot Lake to Lake Simcoe and forms the border between Ramara township to the north and the Brock township to the south from the river mouth to the edge of their border with the city of Kawartha Lakes at the east.

The lower section of the river is now part of the Trent-Severn Waterway, although a new more direct channel was cut at the end of the 19th century, bypassing the original mouth of the river. The Talbot River drains the natural Raven and Talbot Lakes, as well as the man-made Mitchell and Canal Lakes.

Even before the construction of the waterway, the river provided an important transportation corridor for native peoples and early settlers.

See also
List of Ontario rivers

References

Sources

Rivers of Kawartha Lakes
Rivers of Simcoe County
Tributaries of Lake Simcoe